The Good Companions is a 1933 British comedy film directed by Victor Saville starring Jessie Matthews, John Gielgud and Edmund Gwenn. It is based on the 1929 novel of the same name by J.B. Priestley.

Plot
A group of widely divergent characters meet up with a broken-down touring concert-party, throw in their lot with them, and eventually triumph after temporary setbacks. This British musical-comedy follows an unlikely trio as they try to revive the fortunes of the floundering theatrical troupe. School teacher Inigo Jolifant (John Gielgud) with his talent for songwriting, and recently unemployed Jess Oakroyd (Edmund Gwenn) with his theatrical ambitions, together persuade Miss Trant (Mary Glynne), an older single woman looking for adventure, to fund them as they attempt to bring "The Dinky Doos" back into the spotlight. Susie Dean (Jessie Matthews) is a chorus girl who dreams of stardom, and when she's made the new leader of the show, it looks as if her dreams may finally come true.

Cast

 Jessie Matthews as Susie Dean
 Edmund Gwenn as Jess Oakroyd
 John Gielgud as Inigo Jollifant
 Mary Glynne as Miss Elizabeth Trant
 Percy Parsons as Morton Mitcham
 Alec Fraser as Doctor Hugh MacFarlane
 Max Miller as Millbrau 
 A. W. Baskcomb as Jimmy
 Florence Gregson as Mrs. Oakroyd
 Frank Pettingell as Sam Oglethorpe
 Laurence Hanray as Mr. Tarvin
 Annie Esmond as Mrs. Tarvin
 George Zucco as Fauntley
 Frederick Piper as Ted Oglethorpe
 Cyril Smith as Leonard Oakroyd
 Tom Shale as Gatford Hotel landlord
 Dennis Hoey as Joe Brundit
 Richard Dolman as Jerry Jerningham 
 Mignon O'Doherty as Mrs. Tipstead
 Finlay Currie as Monte Mortimer 
 Jack Hawkins as Albert
 Ivor Barnard as Eric Tipstead 
 Olive Sloane as Effie 
 Wally Patch as Fred - Driver's Mate 
 Barbara Gott as Big Annie 
 Mae Bacon as Gatford Barmaid 
 Ben Williams as Man Cleaning Windows at Hotel Reception

Production
Gielgud had appeared in the 1931 theatrical version of the novel, written by Priestley, which had run for more than three hundred performances in the West End. Adele Dixon who had played Susie Dean on stage was replaced by Jessie Matthews.

It was shot at the Lime Grove Studios in Shepherd's Bush. The film's sets were designed by the art director Alfred Junge while the costumes were by Gordon Conway. Henry Ainley narrated the prologue.

Critical reception
In comparing the film to the book, The New York Times critic Mordaunt Hall wrote, "It is, indeed, a better production than was to be expected, for, while there are omissions and a certain hastening of parts of the narrative, the cheery personalities are present and in good form," and concluded, "Miss Matthews sings pleasingly and dances gracefully, while Mr. Gielgud's portrayal is extraordinarily real. It is one of those stories which is all the more worth while for having been made in England, for, aside from the naturalness of the players, there are the scenes of country houses and hedged roads, which add to the general effect of the picture"; whereas Time Out wrote, "Saville's direction is adequate rather than inspired, but he elicits marvellous performances from his disparate cast. Matthews' portrayal of a bubblingly neurotic soubrette is wonderful, and not surprisingly shot her to stardom. The film does feed on rather than explore the twee camaraderie of the provincial touring company, but an English backstage musical as witty and well-handled as this is something to be thankful for indeed"; and Leonard Maltin called it "a delightful film. Matthews is given full rein to display her considerable musical and comedic charms; Gielgud is equally humorous and surprising. He even sings!"

References

External links

1933 films
1933 comedy films
British comedy films
British black-and-white films
Films directed by Victor Saville
Films with screenplays by Ian Dalrymple
Films based on British novels
Films based on works by J. B. Priestley
Films set in London
Films set in England
Films shot at Lime Grove Studios
Fox Film films
Gainsborough Pictures films
1930s English-language films
1930s American films
1930s British films
English-language comedy films